Josef Schneider may refer to:

 Josef Schneider Sr. (1840–1927), first producer of electricity in Germany
 Josef Schneider (footballer) (1901–?), Austrian football player and manager
 Josef Schneider (grenadier), Wehrmacht soldier
 Josef Schneider (rower) (1891–1966), Swiss rower 
 Josef Schneider (skier) (born 1957), German Olympic skier
 Josef Schneider (soldier), Wehrmacht officer

See also
 Joe Schneider (1926–2013), New Zealand rower
 Joseph Schneider, Australian architect